Melchior Cibinensis was a Hungarian alchemical writer active in the first part of the 16th century. He is known for the Processus sub forma missae, an alchemical mass, now dated to around 1525; it was published in the Theatrum Chemicum of 1602, and formed part of a celebrated later collection Symbola Aureae Mensae from 1617 of Michael Maier.

The identity of Melchior is still a subject of debate. The candidate proposed by Carl Jung was Nicolas Melchior Szebeni. This Nicolas was chaplain and from 1490 court astrologer to Vladislaus II of Bohemia and Hungary to whom the Processus was dedicated. It has more recently been proposed that Melchior was a pseudonym of Nicolaus Olahus. Another name given is Menyhért Miklós.

References
Kiss, Farkas Gábor; Láng, Benedek; Popa-Gorjanu, Cosmin, The Alchemical Mass of Nicolaus Melchior Cibinensis: Text, Identity and Speculations,  Ambix, Volume 53, Number 2, July 2006, pp. 143–159

Notes

Hungarian alchemists
Hungarian writers
Year of death unknown
Year of birth unknown
16th-century alchemists